IBM POWER (or IBM Power) may refer to:

 IBM POWER (software), an IBM operating system enhancement package
 IBM POWER instruction set architecture, a predecessor to the PowerPC/Power ISA instruction set architecture
 IBM Power microprocessors, a line of microprocessors implementing the IBM POWER and the PowerPC/Power ISA instruction set architectures
 IBM Power Systems, a family of server computers